Ichtyoselmis macrantha (also spelled Ichthyoselmis; formerly known as Dicentra macrantha; large-flowered dicentra) is the only species in the genus Ichtyoselmis.

In Sichuan Province, China, it is known as goldfish plant, because of the shape and color of the flowers.

Etymology
Although the correct spelling of the Greek word uses th (theta), the scientific name uses t.

Description
Leaves are divided in threes twice or three times and toothed.

The two outer petals are bent outwards. The two inner petals are connected at the tip and pointed.

References

 Bleeding hearts, Corydalis, and their relatives. Mark Tebbitt, Magnus Lidén, and Henrik Zetterlund. Timber Press. 2008. — Google Books

External links
Scientific-web: Ichtyoselmis macrantha
1, 2 — photos from a botanizing journey to Yunnan and Sichuan by Arche aux Plantes
Shoot gardening U.K. -  Dicentra macrantha - gardening website.

Fumarioideae
Monotypic Papaveraceae genera
Flora of Myanmar
Flora of China
Garden plants of Asia
Taxa named by Magnus Lidén